Nathaniel Giles (born 1591) was a Canon of Windsor from 1624 to 1644.

Family

He was born in 1591, the son of Nathaniel Giles, master of the Choir of St George's Chapel, Windsor Castle.

Career

He was appointed:
Rector of Newbury, Berkshire 1619
Rector of Newton Longueville, Buckinghamshire 1620
Prebendary of Worcester 1627
Rector of Chinnor, Oxford 1628 - 1644
Rector of Sloley, Norfolk 1629
Rector of Ruislip, 1648

He was appointed to the tenth stall in St George's Chapel, Windsor Castle in 1624 and held the canonry until 1644.

Notes 

1591 births
Canons of Windsor
Year of death missing